The following are schools that field NCAA affiliated ski teams. The NCAA holds a single, all-division championship for men, and a single, all-division championship for women.

There are three NCAA affiliated ski conferences: the Central Collegiate Ski Association, Eastern Intercollegiate Ski Association and Rocky Mountain Intercollegiate Ski Association.  The conferences consist of Division I, Division II, Division III, and some non-NCAA affiliated teams which compete as guests.  Some teams compete in the United States Collegiate Ski and Snowboard Association which is not affiliated with the NCAA.

Central Collegiate Ski Association

Division I
University of Wisconsin-Green Bay (Nordic only)

Division II
Michigan Tech University (Nordic only)
Northern Michigan University (Nordic only)
St Cloud State University (Women's Nordic only)

Division III
College of Saint Scholastica (Nordic only)
Saint Olaf College

Eastern Intercollegiate Ski Association
All schools listed below compete together but follow the recruiting rules of their respective division.

Division I

Boston College (Alpine only)
Dartmouth College
Harvard University
University of New Hampshire
University of Vermont

Division II

Saint Michael's College

Division III

Bates College
Bowdoin College (Nordic only)
Colby College 
Colby-Sawyer (Alpine only)
Middlebury College
Plymouth State University (Alpine only)
St. Lawrence University
St. Joseph's College of Maine
Williams College

Rocky Mountain Intercollegiate Ski Association

Division I

University of Colorado
University of Denver
Montana State University
University of Utah

Division II

University of Alaska Anchorage
University of Alaska Fairbanks (Nordic only)
Westminster College (Utah) (Alpine only)

Associate Members
Colorado Mountain College (Alpine only)

United States Collegiate Skiing and Snowboarding Association (USCSA)

Division I
These programs are not in the NCAA and range in level of competitiveness. Some are sponsored by the school and are varsity programs, while others are club teams.

References

NCAA skiing programs